Joël Donald (born 13 May 1996) is a Dutch football player who plays for SVV Scheveningen in the Dutch Tweede Divisie.

Club career
He made his professional debut in the Eerste Divisie for SC Telstar on 9 September 2016 in a game against De Graafschap.

Personal life
He is a younger brother of footballer Mitchell Donald. Born in the Netherlands, Donald is of Surinamese descent.

References

External links
 Voetbal International profile
 

1996 births
Living people
Footballers from Amsterdam
Association football forwards
Dutch footballers
Dutch sportspeople of Surinamese descent
SC Telstar players
FC Groningen players
Eerste Divisie players
Tweede Divisie players
Derde Divisie players